Santa Fe Brewing Company is a brewery located in Santa Fe, New Mexico. It was established in 1988 as New Mexico's first craft brewery  and has since become the largest brewery in the state. Its beers are distributed throughout the Southwestern United States. In 2010, Santa Fe Brewing became the first brewery in New Mexico to produce canned beer.

History
The brewery was founded by Michael Levis in 1988. In 1996, Levis sold the business to a partnership formed by his son Ty along with Dave Forester, Brian Lock, and Carlos Muller.  Lock bought out the other three partners in 2003 to become the sole owner. In 2005, Santa Fe Brewing moved its operations to a much larger facility, the former Wolf Canyon Brewery near Interstate 25. This doubled the brewery's capacity from 15 barrels to 30 barrels, and annual production increased from 1,750 barrels in 2004 to 6,000 barrels in 2007.

In 2010, Santa Fe Brewing began offering its Freestyle Pilsner and Happy Camper IPA in cans, becoming the first brewery in New Mexico to do so.

See also

List of breweries in New Mexico
List of microbreweries

References
https://my-traveltips.com/

External links
 

Beer brewing companies based in New Mexico
Companies based in Santa Fe, New Mexico
Buildings and structures in Santa Fe, New Mexico
Drinking establishments in New Mexico
American companies established in 1988
Food and drink companies established in 1988
1988 establishments in New Mexico
Tourist attractions in Santa Fe, New Mexico